Sofiya Zenchenko (born ) is a Ukrainian weightlifter, who represented Ukraine at international competitions. 

She won the bronze medal in the 63 kg category at the 2014 Summer Youth Olympics.

Major results

References

External links
http://weekly.ahram.org.eg/News/7345.aspx
http://www.alamy.com/stock-photo-nanjing-chinas-jiangsu-province-21st-aug-2014-zenchenko-sofiya-of-72828754.html
http://noc-ukr.org/en/news/9358/
https://www.youtube.com/watch?v=g_8tlUWiVbE

1997 births
Living people
Ukrainian female weightlifters
Place of birth missing (living people)
Weightlifters at the 2014 Summer Youth Olympics
21st-century Ukrainian women